Zakhmi Sher is a 1984 Indian Hindi-language action film produced by Pradeep Sharma under the TUTU Films banner and directed by Dasari Narayana Rao. Starring Jeetendra and Dimple Kapadia  with the music composed by Laxmikant–Pyarelal, it is a remake of the Telugu language film Bobbili Puli. The film marks Kapadia's return to cinema after Bobby (1973).

Plot
Honest and diligent Major Vijay Kumar Singh is called back from active duty to attend to the funeral of his mother. He declines as he has to be present on the front as well as inspire others. When he returns home, he grieves for his mother and sets about finding a suitable groom for his unmarried sister. He finds out that Reshmi is in love with a man, and he goes to talk to this man's father. The father, Lala, agrees to the marriage, provided Vijay marries his mentally retarded daughter, Anandi. Vijay instantly refuses, but when he finds out that his sister is pregnant, he agrees to marry Anandi. Then circumstances force him to be a witness in two crimes - one an arson set deliberately, and the other about a drunk driver who crashes some people that are asleep on a city footpath. In both cases, the Judge dismisses the matters. Confused and hurt by a system that is unable to punish the guilty, he ponders on what is going to happen to his country. Then he learns that his mother did not die, but was murdered and he sets out to find the person(s) responsible for this. Vijay does not trust the police now, and knows that they will let the guilty go unpunished, and sets out to hunt them down one by one - until he comes across the man who actually killed his mother - none other than a holy man named Swami Kashinath Singh - a man who claims to be his biological father, and a man who claims that killing his wife was a mistake. What will Vijay's next action be? Will he be objective enough to punish his father for this heinous crime, or will emotion overwhelm him from making any decision?

Cast
Jeetendra as Major Vijay Kumar Singh
Dimple Kapadia as Advocate Anu Gupta
Jayasudha as Anandi
Amrish Puri as Swami Kashinath Singh
Shakti Kapoor as Arsonist
Nilu Phule as Lala (Anandi's father)
Om Shivpuri as Mr. Gupta 
Vinod Mehra as Police Inspector
Bharat Bhushan as Judge
Jeevan as Lawyer
Rohini Hattangadi

Soundtrack
Lyrics: Santosh Anand

References

External links
 

1984 films
1980s Hindi-language films
1984 action films
Indian action films
Films scored by Laxmikant–Pyarelal
Films directed by Dasari Narayana Rao
Hindi remakes of Telugu films
Hindi-language action films